Allium mongolicum is an Asian species of wild onion native to Mongolia, Inner Mongolia, Tuva, Kazakhstan, and parts of China (Gansu, Liaoning, Ningxia, Qinghai, Shaanxi, Xinjiang).

Allium mongolicum produces clumps of thin bulbs. Scapes are up to 30 cm tall, sometimes more than one on the same plant. Leaves are hollow, tubular, shorter than the scape. Umbels are densely crowded with many red or purple-red flowers.

References

mongolicum
Onions
Flora of temperate Asia
Plants described in 1875